KGMC (channel 43) is a television station licensed to Merced, California, United States, serving the Fresno area as an affiliate of the Spanish-language network Estrella TV. It is the flagship television property of owner Cocola Broadcasting, and is sister to eight low-power stations. KGMC's studios are located on West Herndon Avenue in the Pinedale area of Fresno, and its transmitter is located on Bald Mountain, south of Meadow Lakes in Fresno County.

A live simulcast of some of KGMC's non-network programming can be seen on the Cocola Broadcasting homepage.

History

Early years
The UHF channel 43 allocation in the Fresno market was originally licensed to KICU-TV. Operating as an independent station, the station signed on the air on December 23, 1961, five days after Fresno's first independent station, KAIL (channel 53, now a MyNetworkTV affiliate on channel 7) took to the air. KICU carried a mix of movies and other independent fare. Toward the end of its run, KICU also picked up some NBC programs that were not cleared to air by that network's Fresno affiliate, KMJ-TV (channel 24, now KSEE-TV). The station ceased operations in 1968; the KICU-TV call letters are now used by an independent station in San Jose.

1990s–present
KGMC first signed on the air on September 11, 1992, as KSDI; the station was originally an affiliate of the viewer-request music video network The Box. That December, the station changed its call letters to KGMC (the calls were previously used by KOCB in Oklahoma City, Oklahoma from 1979 to 1989).

In January 1995, the station entered into a local marketing agreement with Pappas Telecasting Companies, owner of Fox affiliate KMPH-TV (channel 26). Pappas programmed the station from 7:00 to 9:00 a.m. and again from 3:00 to 11:00 p.m. daily, airing a blend of cartoons, classic sitcoms and older movies. On January 11 of that year, the station became a charter affiliate of The WB. KGMC continued to run religious programs, paid programming, and home shopping programs during time periods that were not programmed by Pappas.

In 1997, KGMC terminated the LMA with Pappas, switching full-time to a format of infomercials and religious programs. Pappas then moved the WB affiliation first to KMPH on a secondary basis, and later to KNSO (channel 51) in 1998 and finally to KFRE-TV (channel 59) in 2001, where the network remained until The WB ceased operations in September 2006 and was replaced by The CW. In the meantime, KGMC would join home shopping network America's Store in 1998; after America's Store was shut down by HSN in 2007, KGMC switched its programming to Jewelry Television. KGMC had been the only full-power independent television station in the Fresno market, until August 1, 2012, when it became an affiliate of the Spanish-language network MundoFox. On December 1, 2016, with the demise of MundoMax, KGMC switched to Liberman Broadcasting's Estrella TV network.

On February 27, 2020, Cocola agreed to transfer the license assets of KGMC to NBCUniversal's Telemundo Station Group in exchange for acquiring the KNSO license. The sale was completed on September 1. Upon completion of the transfer in which the callsigns were also swapped, KGMC now operates on VHF channel 11, while KNSO operates on UHF channel 27.

Technical information

Subchannels
The station's digital signal is multiplexed:

Analog-to-digital conversion
KGMC shut down its analog signal, over UHF channel 43, on June 12, 2009, the official date in which full-power television stations in the United States transitioned from analog to digital broadcasts under federal mandate. The station's digital signal was relocated from its pre-transition UHF channel 44 to channel 43.

Spectrum auction repack
KGMC was one of nearly 1,000 television stations that were required to change their digital channel allocation in the upcoming spectrum auction repack in early 2018. KGMC reallocated its digital signal to UHF channel 27 in phase one of the auction.

References

External links
Website of parent company Cocola Broadcasting

GMC (TV)
Television channels and stations established in 1992
1992 establishments in California
Merced, California
Estrella TV affiliates
Antenna TV affiliates
MeTV affiliates
Cozi TV affiliates
Laff (TV network) affiliates
GMC (TV)